Philip Christofanelli (born 1989/90) is a Republican member of the Missouri House of Representatives.

Biography
Christofanelli graduated from Washington University in St. Louis in 2011 with a Bachelor of Arts in political science, and graduated from Washington University School of Law in 2021. He was elected to the Missouri Republican State Committee at age 21, and interned for U.S. Representative Dan Benishek in 2013, later serving as his press spokesman.

Christofanelli ran for the House in 2016 to succeed retiring Representative Mark Parkinson. At age 27, Christofanelli was the youngest member of the Missouri House of Representatives.

Christofanelli discussed being gay during an interview in 2021. He is one of three LGBT Republicans to have served in the Missouri House of Representatives.

Political positions
Christofanelli opposes abortion. He supports gun rights. He supports a right-to-work law for Missouri.

Electoral history

References

External links
  (campaign)

 

20th-century births
21st-century American politicians
Gay politicians
LGBT state legislators in Missouri
Living people
Politicians from Springfield, Illinois
People from St. Peters, Missouri
Republican Party members of the Missouri House of Representatives
Washington University in St. Louis alumni
LGBT conservatism in the United States
Year of birth missing (living people)